Edriss Hushmand (born 1 May 1999) is a footballer who plays for Swedish club  Trelleborg and the Afghanistan national football team, as a midfielder.

References

1999 births
Living people
Swedish footballers
Swedish people of Afghan descent
Afghan footballers
Afghanistan international footballers
BK Olympic players
Trelleborgs FF players
Footballers from Malmö
Association football midfielders